Deepawali or Diwali is an ancient Indian festival.

Deepawali or Dipawali may also refer to:

 Dipawali (Jainism), a festival celebrated by Jain community
 Deepawali (1960 film), an Indian Telugu mythological film
 Deepawali (2000 film), an Indian Kannada film starring Vishnuvardhan and Ramesh Aravind
 Deepavali (2007 film), an Indian Tamil film starring Jayam Ravi and Bhavana
 "Diwali" (The Office), an episode of the American comedy television series The Office